The Joey Bishop Show is an American sitcom starring entertainer Joey Bishop that aired on NBC from September 1961, to April 1964. After NBC canceled the series due to low ratings, it was picked up by CBS where it aired for its fourth and final season.

Executive produced by Danny Thomas, The Joey Bishop Show is a spin-off of Thomas' series The Danny Thomas Show.

Overview

Season 1
The series was conceived as a vehicle for entertainer Joey Bishop by Danny Thomas and Louis F. Edelman in 1960. At the time, Thomas was starring in his own series, Make Room for Daddy (later known as The Danny Thomas Show), airing on CBS. Thomas' series was then a top-20 hit and served as a launching pad for The Joey Bishop Show. The series' pilot episode, titled "Everything Happens to Me", aired on March 27, 1961, during the eighth season of Danny Thomas.
In the pilot, an incompetent Hollywood "public relations man" named Joey Mason (Bishop) forgets to make proper accommodations for an exhausted Danny Williams (Thomas) after he arrives in Los Angeles to play a show. Joey is then forced to put Danny up in the home he shares with his colorful parents, Mr. and Mrs. Mason (played by Billy Gilbert and Madge Blake) and two unmarried sisters, Betty (Virginia Vincent) and aspiring actress Stella (Marlo Thomas).

By the time the series was picked up by NBC, Bishop's character's name was changed to Joey Barnes (Bishop had insisted his character and he share the same initials) and the character of Joey's father was dropped. Two additional characters were added; a younger brother named Larry (Warren Berlinger), and brother-in-law Frank (Joe Flynn), the husband of Joey's older sister Betty. The series' first incarnation features Joey, a well-intending but hapless and trouble-prone young man, who works for the Hollywood public relations firm, Willoughby, Cleary and Jones. The firm is headed by J.P. Willoughby (John Griggs), Joey's demanding boss. Willoughby's secretary, Barbara Simpson (Nancy Hadley) has an unrequited crush on a mostly oblivious Joey. Joey lives with and supports his widowed mother, Mrs. Barnes and younger siblings, aspiring actress Stella and medical student Larry. Joey also supports his older sister Betty and her proudly unemployed husband Frank whom Joey tries to encourage to get and keep a job.

Storylines during the first season typically revolve around Joey's misadventures concerning his job and problems with his colorful family. As the series was a spin-off of The Danny Thomas Show, Danny Thomas and Marjorie Lord appeared as their Danny Thomas characters in the first season's fourth episode titled "This Is Your Life". Sid Melton, who appeared as Danny's boss Charley Halper on Danny Thomas, also appeared.

Upon its September 1961 premiere, the series struggled in the ratings. In an effort to improve viewership, NBC decided to "readjust" the series. Midway through the first season, several characters, including Joey's older sister Betty, brother-in-law Frank, Joey's potential love interest Barbara Simpson and Joey's boss Mr. Willoughby, were dropped. Several crew members were also dismissed.
In episode 17, "Home Sweet Home", Bill Bixby joined the cast as Charles "Charlie" Raymond, Mr. Willoughby's nephew who takes over as president of the PR firm and becomes Joey's new boss. The changes helped to improve the ratings, and NBC renewed the series for a second season. The final two episodes of the first season: "A Show of His Own" and "The Image"
deal with Joey getting his own network show.

Seasons 2–4

After the first season, Bishop decided to change the format of the series. In addition to the format changing, The Joey Bishop Show began filming in front of a live audience and also featured an entirely different supporting cast. In the second incarnation, Joey Barnes is the host of a New York City talk/variety television show. Abby Dalton joined the cast as Joey's new wife Ellie (whom Joey called "Texas" because she hailed from Texas) and the two live at the Carlton Arms, a posh Manhattan apartment building. Towards the end of season two, Ellie discovers she is pregnant with the couple's first child. Their son, Joey Barnes, Jr. (played by Dalton's real son Matthew David Smith), was born in the season-two finale "The Baby Cometh". Also joining the cast was Guy Marks, who portrayed Freddie, Joey's manager. Marks left the series after 19 episodes and Corbett Monica joined the cast as Larry Corbett, Joey's head writer. The supporting cast also includes Mary Treen as Hilda, the Barnes' maid and baby nurse, with whom Joey frequently trades insults. Joe Besser portrayed Mr. Jillson, the building's goofy and henpecked superintendent who lives in fear of his wife, Tantalia, who is never seen but often heard.

Storylines for the remainder of the series' run mainly focus on Joey's home life, but also feature storylines involving Joey's job as a television host. As such, various celebrities (who typically appeared as themselves) who were guests on Joey Barnes' talk show appeared throughout the series' run. Although the second incarnation of the series was seemingly unrelated to the first incarnation, the series featured Danny Thomas in two season-three episodes: "Danny Gives Joey Advice" and "Andy Williams Visits Joey". Rusty Hamer, who appeared on Danny Thomas as Rusty Williams, also appeared as his character in three season-four episodes: "Rusty Arrives", "Rusty's Education", and "Joey Entertains Rusty's Fraternity".

Cast

Main

 Joey Bishop as Joey Barnes
 Abby Dalton as Ellie Barnes (1962–1965)
 Madge Blake as Mrs. Barnes (1961–1962)
 Warren Berlinger as Larry Barnes (1961–1962)
 Joe Flynn as Frank (1961–1962)
 John Griggs as J.P. Willoughby (1961)
 Nancy Hadley as Barbara Simpson (1961–1962)
 Virginia Vincent as Betty (1961–1962)
 Marlo Thomas as Stella Barnes (1961–1962)
 Joe Besser as Mr. Jillson (1962–1965)
 Bill Bixby as Charles Raymond (1962)
 Guy Marks as Freddie (1962)
 Corbett Monica as Larry Corbett (1963–1965)
 Mary Treen as Hilda (1962–1965)
 Joey Forman as Dr. Sam Nolan (1964–1965)

Guest stars

The Joey Bishop Show featured many celebrity guest stars who appeared as themselves. Among the celebrity guest stars are:

 The Andrews Sisters
 Edgar Bergen
 Milton Berle
 Jack Carter
 Vic Damone
 Tommy Davis
 Willie Davis
 Don Drysdale
 Zsa Zsa Gabor
 Shecky Greene
 Robert Goulet
 Buddy Hackett
 Frank Howard
 Jack Jones
 Don Knotts
 Jack E. Leonard
 Oscar Levant
 Jerry Lewis
 Claudine Longet
 Ed McMahon
 Jan Murray
 Jack Paar
 Bobby Rydell
 Roberta Sherwood
 Bill "Moose" Skowron
 Danny Thomas
 Andy Williams

Actors who appeared in guest starring roles include:

 Jack Albertson
 Merry Anders
 Cliff Arquette
 Parley Baer
 Raymond Bailey
 Neville Brand
 Frank Cady
 Jean Carson
 Jackie Coogan
 Ellen Corby
 Henry Gibson
 Rusty Hamer
 Sterling Holloway
 Nancy Kulp
 Sue Ane Langdon
 Joi Lansing
 George Lindsey
 Howard McNear
 Jaye P. Morgan
 Burt Mustin
 Maidie Norman
 Dennis O'Keefe
 Barbara Stanwyck
 George Tobias
 Lee Van Cleef
 Dawn Wells

Episodes

Lost episode
One Season 3 episode of The Joey Bishop Show is now considered lost. The episode, known only as #85, was filmed on November 15, 1963 and guest starred comedian and impressionist Vaughn Meader. Meader rose to fame in the early 1960s for his comedic impersonation of then-President John F. Kennedy featured on the popular comedy album The First Family. The episode centered around Meader performing his Kennedy impersonation in routines opposite Joey Bishop. A week after filming, President Kennedy was assassinated in Dallas. President Kennedy's death promptly ended Meader's career – his club bookings and television appearances were quickly canceled and his albums were pulled from stores. The episode featuring Meader was scheduled to air in February 1964, but was pulled by NBC. The episode never aired and was reportedly destroyed.

Production
The series was created by Louis F. Edelman and Danny Thomas who also served as the executive producer. The series was produced by Thomas' company, Bellmar Enterprises. It was filmed at Desilu Studios in front of a live studio audience, with a laugh track added during post-production for "sweetening" purposes.

Upon its debut on NBC in 1961, The Joey Bishop Show was telecast in black-and-white during its first season except for five episodes which were filmed and broadcast in color to promote parent company RCA's color television sets on special "all color nights" which included episodes of "Wagon Train." Those episodes were broadcast on October 4, 1961; November 1, 1961; December 6, 1961; February 7, 1962; and March 14, 1962. The series second and third seasons were fully broadcast in color. After the series moved to CBS for the 1964–65 season, it reverted to black-and-white.

Reception and ratings
Upon its premiere, The Joey Bishop Show struggled in the ratings. After the first re-tooling, ratings for the series improved and NBC renewed it for a second season. The series' second revamped season proved to be popular with audiences and ratings increased. By the end of the third season, the series had dropped in the ratings again and NBC announced it would be dropped from its lineup in January 1964 (the series' third-season finale episode aired in May 1964). Around this time, Danny Thomas decided to end his series after eleven years despite its still high ratings. To compensate for Thomas' absence, CBS immediately picked up The Joey Bishop Show for the 1964–65 television season.

The Season 4 season opener, "Joey Goes to CBS", premiered on Sunday night September 27, 1964 at 9:30 P.M. opposite NBC's highly popular western series Bonanza. As a result, ratings for The Joey Bishop Show were low. By late fall 1964, ratings had not improved. In an effort to save the series, CBS moved it to Tuesday nights opposite the second half of ABC's Combat! and NBC's Mr. Novak. Ratings still remained low and CBS announced the series’ cancellation in January 1965. The series finale aired on March 30, 1965.

Syndication and home media
Episodes of The Joey Bishop Show aired on TV Land in 1998.

In 2016, the series began airing on Retro TV.

Antenna TV announced in October 2016 it would begin airing the series the following January, including the rarely seen first season.

In September 2004, Questar Entertainment released the complete second season of The Joey Bishop Show on Region 1 DVD in the United States.

On March 13, 2018, SFM Entertainment (distributed by Allied Vaughn) released all four seasons plus a "Complete Series" set on DVD in Region 1 via Amazon.com's CreateSpace program. These are Manufacture-on-Demand (MOD) releases, available exclusively through Amazon.

References

External links

 

1961 American television series debuts
1965 American television series endings
1960s American sitcoms
1960s American workplace comedy television series
American television spin-offs
Black-and-white American television shows
CBS original programming
English-language television shows
NBC original programming
Television series about show business
Television series by CBS Studios
American television series revived after cancellation
Television shows set in Los Angeles
Television shows set in New York City
Works about public relations